Electronic tagging is a form of surveillance that uses an electronic device affixed to a person.

In some jurisdictions, an electronic tag fitted above the ankle is used for people as part of their bail or probation conditions. It is also used in healthcare settings and in immigration contexts. Electronic tagging can be used in combination with the global positioning system (GPS). For short-range monitoring of a person that wears an electronic tag, radio frequency technology is used.

History 
The electronic monitoring of humans found its first commercial applications in the 1980s. Portable transceivers that could record the location of volunteers were first developed by a group of researchers at Harvard University in the early 1960s. The researchers cited the psychological perspective of B. F. Skinner as underpinning for their academic project. The portable electronic tag was called behavior transmitter-reinforcer and could transmit data two-ways between a base station and a volunteer who simulated a young adult offender. Messages were supposed to be sent to the tag, so as to provide positive reinforcement to the young offender and thus assist in rehabilitation. The head of this research project was Ralph Kirkland Schwitzgebel and his twin brother collaborator, Robert Schwitzgebel (family name later shortened to Gable). The main base-station antenna was mounted on the roof of the Old Cambridge Baptist Church; the minister was the dean of the Harvard Divinity School.

Reviewers of the prototype electronic tagging strategy were sceptical. In 1966, the Harvard Law Review ridiculed the electronic tags as Schwitzgebel Machine and a myth emerged, according to which the prototype electronic tagging project used brain implants and transmitted verbal instructions to volunteers. The editor of a well-known U.S. government publication, Federal Probation, rejected a manuscript submitted by Ralph Kirkland Schwitzgebel, and included a letter which read in part: "I get the impression from your article that we are going to make automatons out of our parolees and that the parole officer of the future will be an expert in telemetry, sitting at his large computer, receiving calls day and night, and telling his parolees what to do in all situations and circumstances [...] Perhaps we should also be thinking about using electronic devices to rear our children. Since they do not have built-in consciences to tell them right from wrong, all they would have to do is to push the 'mother' button, and she would take over the responsibility for decision-making."  Laurence Tribe in 1973 published information on the failed attempts by those involved in the project to find a commercial application for electronic tagging.

In the U.S., the 1970s saw an end of rehabilitative sentencing, including for example discretionary parole release. Those found guilty of a criminal offense were sent to prison, leading to sudden increase in the prison population. Probation became more common, as judges saw the potential of electronic tagging, leading to an increasing emphasis on surveillance. Advances in computer-aided technology made offender monitoring feasible and affordable. After all, the Schwitzgebel prototype had been built out of surplus missile tracking equipment. A collection of early electronic monitoring equipment is housed at the National Museum of Psychology in Akron, Ohio.

The attempt to monitor offenders became moribund until, in 1982, Arizona state district judge, Jack Love, convinced a former sales representative of Honeywell Information Systems, Michael T. Goss, to start a monitoring company, National Incarceration Monitor and Control Services (NIMCOS). The NIMCOS company built several credit card-sized transmitters that could be strapped onto an ankle. The receiver could be connected to a telephone, so that the data from the electronic ankle tag could be sent to a mainframe computer. The design aim of the electronic tag was the reporting of a potential home detention breach. In 1983, judge Jack Love in a state district court imposed home curfew on three offenders who had been sentenced to probation. The home detention was a probation condition and entailed 30 days of electronic monitoring at home. The NIMCOS electronic ankle tag was trialed on those three probationers, two of whom re-offended. Thus, while the goal of home confinement was satisfied, the aim of reducing crime through probation was not.

Additional technologies

Sweat alcohol content monitor

According to Alcohol Monitoring Services (AMS), Secure Continuous Remote Alcohol Monitoring (SCRAM) is currently available in 35 U.S. states.

On 31 March 2021, in England, so-called sobriety tags started being rolled out for some offenders who commit alcohol-driven crimes after testing the tags in Wales in October of the previous year. It monitors sweat samples every 30 minutes and alerts the probation service if alcohol is detected.

Uses

Medical and health 
The use of electronic monitoring in medical practice, especially as it relates to the tagging of the elderly and people with dementia, has generated controversy and media attention. Elderly people in care homes can be tagged with the same electronic monitors used to keep track of young offenders. For people suffering from dementia, electronic monitoring might be beneficially used to prevent them from wandering away. The controversy regarding medical use relates to two arguments, one about the safety of the patients and the other about their privacy and human rights. At over 40%, there is a high prevalence of wandering among patients with dementia. Of the several methods deployed to keep them from wandering, it is reported that 44% of wanderers with dementia have been kept behind closed doors at some point. Other solutions have included constant surveillance, use of makeshift alarms and, the use of various drugs that carry the risk of adverse effects.

Commercial 
Smartphones feature location-based apps to use information from global positioning system (GPS) networks to determine the phone's approximate location.

Parental 
A company in Japan has created GPS-enabled uniforms and backpacks. School children in distress would be able to hit a button, immediately summoning a security agent to their location.

Vehicular 
Public transit vehicles are outfitted with electronic monitoring devices that communicate with GPS systems, tracking their location. App developers have integrated this technology with mobile-phone apps. Now, passengers are able to receive accurate public transit timetables.

Effectiveness 

The use of ankle bracelets, or other electronic monitoring devices, have proven to be effective in research studies and possibly deter crime.

Several factors have been identified as necessary to render electronic monitoring effective: appropriately selecting offenders, robust and appropriate technology, fitting tags promptly, responding to breaches promptly, and communication between the criminal justice system and contractors. The Quaker Council for European Affairs thinks that for electronic monitoring to be effective, it should serve to halt a developing criminal career.

The National Audit Office in England and Wales commissioned a survey to examine the experiences of electronically monitored offenders and the members of their family. The survey revealed that there was common agreement among survey respondents that electronic monitoring was a more effective punitive measure than fines, and that it was generally more effective than community service. An interviewed offender is credited with saying: "You learn more about other crimes [in prison] and I think it gives you a taste to do other crimes because you've sat listening to other people."

In 2006, Kathy Padgett, William Bales, and Thomas Bloomberg conducted an evaluation of 75,661 Florida offenders placed on home detention from 1998 to 2002, in which only a small percentage of these offenders was made to wear an electronic monitoring device. Offenders with electronic tagging were compared to those on home detention without. The factors thought to influence the success or failure of community supervision, including type of electronic monitoring device used and criminal history, were measured. The results showed that offenders who wore electronic tags were both 91.2 percent less likely to abscond and 94.7 percent less likely to commit new offenses, than unmonitored offenders.

Criticisms 
The electronic monitoring of a person, on whom an electronic tag is fitted, does not physically restrain this person from leaving a certain area, nor does it prevent this person from the primary aim of probation. Furthermore, the public perception of home detention is that it is a form of lenient punishment.

As early as 1988, the Penal Affairs Committee of the Religious Society of Friends (Quakers), wrote a briefing in its Green Paper strongly opposing the adoption of electronic monitoring in England and Wales. The Committee noted all the claims made in favor of electronic monitoring but insisted that all such claims could be ‘either demolished or rendered invalid' by arguments against it. The major argument or criticism against it was that on the basis of past experience, electronic monitoring would not absolutely be used on people at risk of custody, but on people who would otherwise have been granted probation or community service. This would lead to a widening of the net of control rather than reducing prison population; it would undermine constructive and supportive interventions. The Penal Committee concluded that the degrading monitoring of fellow human beings, electronically, was morally wrong and unacceptable.

In the US in 1990, Ronald Corbett and Gary T. Marx criticized the use of electronic monitoring in a paper presented at the Annual Meeting of the American Society of Criminology, Baltimore. In the paper, which was later published in the Justice Quarterly, the authors described ‘the new surveillance' technology as sharing some ethos and the information-gathering techniques found in maximum-security prisons thereby allowing them to diffuse into the broader society. They remarked that ‘we appear to be moving toward, rather than away from, becoming a "maximum-security society". The authors acknowledged the data mining capacity of electronic monitoring devices when they stated that "data in many different forms, from widely separated geographical areas, organizations, and time periods, can easily be merged and analyzed".

In 2013, it was reported that many electronic monitoring programs throughout the US were not staffed appropriately. George Drake, a consultant who worked on improving the systems said "Many times when an agency is budgeted for electronic-monitoring equipment, it is only budgeted for the devices themselves". He added that the situation was ‘like buying a hammer and expecting a house to be built. It's simply a tool, and it requires a professional to use that tool and run the program.' Drake warned that programs can get out of control if officials don't develop stringent protocols for how to respond to alerts and don't manage how alerts are generated: "I see agencies with so many alerts that they can't deal with them," Drake said. "They end up just throwing their hands up and saying they can't keep up with them." In Colorado, a review of alert and event data, obtained from the Colorado Department of Corrections under an open-records request, was conducted by matching the names of parolees who appeared in that data with those who appeared in jail arrest records. The data revealed that 212 parole officers were saddled with the duty of responding to nearly 90,000 alerts and notification generated by electronic monitoring devices in the six months reviewed.

Notable instances 
 English professional footballer Jermaine Pennant played a Premier League match in 2005 while wearing an electronic tag; he had received the tag for drunk-driving and driving while disqualified.
 Lindsay Lohan failed to appear at a mandatory hearing, and a warrant was issued for her arrest. The judge ordered Lohan to wear a SCRAM bracelet, an electronic device that monitors the sweat for alcohol and alerts authorities if prohibited substances are consumed.
 Roman Polanski, one of the most famous fugitives from American justice in the world, was arrested in Switzerland. The terms of his release included $4.5 million bail, house arrest wearing an ankle bracelet at his chalet, known as Milky Way, in the Swiss ski resort of Gstaad, after having spent sixty-seven days in a Zurich detention centre.
 Bernard Madoff, the financier accused in a $50 billion fraud case before trial was ordered under house arrest, with electronic monitoring, and posting $10 million bail against his $7 million Manhattan apartment, and against his wife's homes in Montauk, NY, and Palm Beach, FL.
 Dr. Dre (Andre Young), American rapper and record producer, was arrested in 1992 for assaulting record producer Damon Thomas and later pleaded guilty to assault on a police officer, eventually serving house arrest and wearing a police monitoring ankle bracelet.

Jurisdictions

United Kingdom 
Those subject to electronic monitoring may be given curfews as part of bail conditions, sentenced under the Criminal Justice Act 2003 in England and Wales (with separate legislation applying in Scotland). Alternatively offenders may be released from a prison on a Home Detention Curfew. Released prisoners under home detention are allowed out during curfew hours only for:
 A wedding or funeral (service only) of a close relative
 A job interview
 Acting as a witness in court
 Emergencies.

Additionally, electronic monitoring may be used for those subject to a curfew given under the Terrorism Prevention and Investigation Measures Act 2011 (previously known as a control order under the Prevention of Terrorism Act 2005)

Since electronically monitored curfews were rolled out throughout England and Wales their use has increased sharply, from 9,000 cases in 1999–2000 to 53,000 in 2004–05. In 2004–05, the Home Office spent £102.3 million on the electronic monitoring of curfews and electronically monitored curfews are considered cheaper than custody.

Typically, offenders are fitted with an electronic tag around their ankle which sends a regular signal to a receiver unit installed in their home. Some systems are connected to a landline in the case where GSM is not available, whilst most arrangements utilize the mobile phone system to communicate with the monitoring company. If the tag is not functioning or within range of the base station during curfew hours, or if the base is disconnected from the power supply, or the base station is moved then the monitoring company are alerted, who in turn, notify the appropriate authority such as the police, the National Probation Service or the prison the person was released from.

In 2012, the Policy Exchange think tank examined the use of electronic monitoring in England and Wales and made comparisons with technologies and models seen in other jurisdictions, particularly the United States. The report was critical of the Ministry of Justice's model of a fully privatized service - which gave little scope for police or probation services to make use of electronic monitoring. The report, Future of Corrections, also criticized the cost of the service, highlighting an apparent differential between what the UK taxpayer was charged and what could be found in the United States.

Subsequently, there were a number of scandals in relation to electronic monitoring in England and Wales, with a criminal investigation opened by the Serious Fraud Office into the activities of Serco and G4S. As a result of the investigation, Serco agreed to repay £68.5 million to the taxpayer and G4S agreed to repay £109 million. The duopoly were subsequently stripped of their contract, with Capita taking over the contract. In 2017, another criminal investigation saw police make a number of arrests in relation to allegations that at least 32 criminals on tag had paid up to £400 to Capita employees in order to have 'loose' tags fitted, allowing them to remove their tags.

The monitoring of sex offenders via electronic tagging is currently in debate due to certain rights offenders have in England and Wales.

Electronic tagging has begun being used on psychiatric patients, prompting concern from mental health advocates who state that the practice is demeaning.

In June 2022, the British Home Office announced a one-year pilot to track migrants who arrived on small boats on "dangerous and unnecessary routes" with GPS devices that will help "maintain regular contact" and more "effectively process their claims".

Australia and New Zealand 
In Australia and New Zealand existing law permits the use of electronic monitoring as condition for bail, probation or parole. But, according to the 2004 Standard Guidelines for Corrections in Australia the surveillance must be proportionate to the risk of re-offense. It is also required that, the surveillance of the offender is minimally intrusive for other people who live at the premises. Electronic tagging of a person is part of different electronic monitoring systems in Australia. Correctional agency statistics are collected in Australia for so called "restricted movement orders". In South Australia, a drive-by facility allows the monitorer to drive past a building in which the tagged person is supposed to be. In New Zealand, the electronic tagging of offenders began 1999, when home detention could be imposed instead of imprisonment.

Brazil 
In August 2010, Brazil awarded a GPS Offender Monitoring contract to kick start its monitoring of offenders and management of the Brazilian governments early release programme

South Africa 
Electronic monitoring as a pilot project was started in March 2012, involving 150 offenders, mostly prisoners serving life terms. The project was rolled out to reduce the South Africa's prison population. It consequently would also reduce the taxpayer's burden on correctional facilities. South Africa locks up more people than any other country on the continent.

See also 
 Automatic vehicle location
 Decarceration in the United States
 Electronic monitoring in the United States

References

Surveillance
Punishments